Nathan Chivers (born 18 July 1976) is an Australian guide skier and skis with Bart Bunting, whom he met in high school. In this role, he won two gold medals at the 2002 Salt Lake City Games in the men's downhill B1–3 and super-G B1–3 events, and a silver medal at the men's giant slalom B1–2 event. He also competed with Bunting at the 2010 Winter Games, where the pair did not win a medal. In 2001, he had an Australian Institute of Sport scholarship for alpine skiing.

Chivers has a wife, Katy, and two children. He works as a manager at his family's nursery.

References

1976 births
Australian male alpine skiers
Alpine skiers at the 2002 Winter Paralympics
Alpine skiers at the 2010 Winter Paralympics
Paralympic alpine skiers of Australia
Medalists at the 2002 Winter Paralympics
Paralympic medalists in alpine skiing
Paralympic gold medalists for Australia
Paralympic silver medalists for Australia
Paralympic sighted guides
Australian Institute of Sport Paralympic skiers
Living people